Metamorphism, in geology, is the solid state recrystallisation of rocks under environmental forces.

Metamorphism may also refer to:

 Metamorphism (Merzbow album) (2006).
 Metamorphism (computer science), a concept similar to a hylomorphism.
 Metamorphic code, computer code that rewrites itself.
 Shapeshifting, the fictional topic, also called "metamorphism"

See also 
 Metamorphosis (disambiguation)